The principle of practical concordance is a principle of German constitutional law to solve conflicting rules.

References

German constitutional law